Dr. Rafael Francisco “Frank” Moya Pons is one of the leading contemporary historians of the Dominican Republic. He has published many important books in the history and cultural heritage of the country. One of his best-known works is Manual de historia dominicana (1992), now in its tenth edition which is a staple work of Dominican historiography. In 1985 he authored the book Between Slavery and Free Labor: The Spanish, in 1998 The Dominican Republic: A National History
and in 2007 	History of the Caribbean: plantations, trade, and war in the Atlantic world. He has also conducted much work into slavery in the Dominican Republic and Caribbean.

Moya has a Degree in 'Philosophy' at the Autonomous University of Santo Domingo (UASD); has a Master in both 'Latin American History' and 'European History' at Georgetown University. Moya has a Ph.D. in 'Latin American History', 'Economic Development' and 'Quantitative Methods' from Columbia University.

Moya Pons has taught history at the Pontifical Catholic University Mother and Teacher in the Dominican Republic, in Columbia and Florida universities in the USA, and has been Research Professor at City College.

Moya was President of the Dominican Academy of History. In 2013, he published Bibliografía de la Historia Dominicana 1730-2010.

References

20th-century Dominican Republic historians
Dominican Republic male writers
Living people
Universidad Autónoma de Santo Domingo alumni
Georgetown University alumni
Columbia University alumni
Columbia University faculty
Academic staff of the Pontificia Universidad Católica Madre y Maestra
University of Florida faculty
Dominican Republic people of Catalan descent
Government ministers of the Dominican Republic
White Dominicans
Year of birth missing (living people)
21st-century Dominican Republic historians